Nkhotakota Solar Power Station, is a  solar power plant under construction in Malawi. The solar farm is under development by a consortium comprising independent power producers Phanes Group and Serengeti Energy Limited (formerly responsAbility Renewable Energy Holding - rAREH).

Location

Overview
The power station is a joint venture between Phanes Group, an independent solar energy investor and developer based in Dubai, United Arab Emirates and responsAbility Renewable Energy Holding (rAREH), a renewable energy investor based in Nairobi, Kenya. Together, they are expected to form a special purpose vehicle company (which we shall refer to as Nkhotakota Solar), which will develop, design, finance, construct and operate the power station. The power generated is expected to be purchased by the Malawian public electric utility company, Electricity Supply Corporation of Malawi (Escom), in accordance with a 20-year power purchase agreement.

Starting with installed capacity of 21 megawatts, the power station, which will be built in phases is expected to be expanded to capacity of 37 megawatts in the second phase. It is estimated that Nkhotakota Solar Power Station will supply 7 GigaWattHours (GWh) of energy annually, enough to supply 200,000 Malawian homes.

Ownership
The table below illustrates the ownership of Nkhotakota Solar Power Station and of Nkhotakota Solar, the special purpose vehicle company that operates the power station.

Funding
The cost of construction is reported to be US$40 million. Lenders, donors and guarantors to the project include:
1. U.S. International Development Finance Corporation (DFC) 2. Africa Trade Insurance Agency (ATI).

See also

List of power stations in Malawi

References

External links
 Nkhotakota Solar Power Plant in Malawi guaranteed a US$ 67M subsidy As of 10 November 2020.

Renewable energy power stations in Malawi
Solar power stations in Malawi